IEC 63110 is an international standard defining a protocol for the management of electric vehicles charging and discharging infrastructures, which is currently under development. IEC 63110 is one of the International Electrotechnical Commission's group of standards for electric road vehicles and electric industrial trucks, and is the responsibility of Joint Working Group 11 (JWG11) of IEC Technical Committee 69 (TC69).

Standard documents 
IEC 63110 consists of the following parts, detailed in separate IEC 63110 standard documents:
 IEC 63110-1: Basic definitions, use cases and architectures
 IEC 63110-2: Technical protocol specifications and requirements
 IEC 63110-3: Requirements for conformance tests

See also 
 ISO 15118
 IEC 61850
 IEC 61851
 OCPP

References 

Electric vehicles
63110